The Central Ohio Transit Authority (COTA) operates 41 fixed-route bus services throughout the Columbus metropolitan area in Central Ohio. The agency operates its standard and frequent bus services seven days per week, and rush hour service Monday to Friday. All buses and routes are wheelchair and mobility device-accessible, and include front-mounted bike racks.

The authority also operates multiple transit services, including the microtransit service COTA//PLUS and the on-demand COTA Mainstream service.

List of routes

Routes 1–12: through downtown
Routes 1 through 12 traverse Downtown Columbus. These routes are classified as local lines.

Routes 21–25: north–south
Routes 21 through 25 are laid out to connect destinations north and south. These routes are classified as crosstown lines.

Routes 31–35: west–east
Routes 31 through 35  are laid out to connect destinations east and west. These routes are classified as crosstown lines.

Routes 41–52: east Columbus
Routes 41 through 52 operate on the city's east side; 41 through 46 serve northeast Columbus, while 51 and 52 serve southeast Columbus. These routes are classified as rush hour (express) lines.

Routes 61–75: west Columbus
Routes 61 through 75 operate on the city's west side; route 61 serves southwest Columbus, while routes 71 through 75 serve northwest Columbus. These routes are classified as rush hour (express) lines.

Other routes

Services
The Central Ohio Transit Authority operates multiple services without fixed routes.

COTA Plus, stylized as COTA//PLUS, is a microtransit service in Grove City and northeast Franklin County. The service enables people to use a mobile app or call COTA's customer service to arrange a trip within service zones created for Grove City and northeast Franklin County. Fares are different from fixed-route COTA services, with single fares at $3, day passes at $6, and weekly passes at $20. C-Pass holders, university students, children, and those with discount IDs receive free or reduced fares relative to their eligibility for other COTA services. The service was first launched in Grove City in July 2019, and expanded with a three-month pilot to the northeast portion of Columbus and Franklin County in May 2020, following service reductions due to the 2019-20 coronavirus pandemic.

COTA Mainstream is an on-demand shared-ride program for riders with disabilities.

Seasonal or event-based services include the summertime "Zoo Bus" to the Columbus Zoo, the "Bus it to the Buckeyes" service for Ohio State University football games at the Ohio Stadium, and the "Zoom to Boom" service to the city's July 4 fireworks show Red, White & Boom.

History
In 1993, COTA began its first "COTA LINK" circulator route, operating in Downtown Columbus. The agency began other circulators, including Easton, Broad Street, and Westerville services around 2000. These services were cut around 2004.

COTA began operating the CBUS service, a free downtown circulator, on May 5, 2014.  The route succeeded the downtown COTA LINK service. In May 2016, COTA began its AirConnect service between downtown and John Glenn Columbus International Airport, available with the $2.75 rush hour service fare. Previously, the agency offered a similar service with a $5 fare from 2001 to 2003, cut due to low ridership. On May 1, 2017, the agency overhauled its bus network, the first redesign since COTA's establishment in 1971. The effort simplified routes, increased bus frequency, connected more locations, and reduced bus congestion in downtown Columbus. The redesign doubled the agency's number of frequent lines and significantly increased weekend service.

COTA began its CMAX service, the first bus rapid transit service in Columbus, on January 1, 2018. In 2019, COTA ended its OSUAir service that connected Ohio State University directly with the Columbus airport, citing low ridership amid other bus route options.

During the COVID-19 pandemic, the majority of the agency's services were suspended. This included all express services, AirConnect, CBUS, and the Night Owl service. COTA restored the express lines in May 2021, reinstating 90 percent of the agency's former services.

References

External links

 
 System map

Columbus
Central Ohio Transit Authority
Bus transportation in Ohio
Transportation in Columbus, Ohio
Bus routes
Bus routes